Società Italiana Ernesto Breda, more usually referred to simply as Breda, was an Italian mechanical manufacturing company founded by Ernesto Breda in Milan in 1886.

History
The firm was founded by Ernesto Breda in Milan in 1886. It originally manufactured locomotives and other railway machinery, but later branched out into armaments and aircraft. Occasionally, not continuously, the company also built trolleybuses.  In 1935, it acquired the railway division of Officine Ferroviarie Meridionali and, soon afterwards, the aircraft division of the same company.

Breda-designed machine guns such as the Breda Model 30 and Breda Model 37 were standard issue weapons for the Royal Italian Army during the Second Italo-Abyssinian War, the Italian Invasion of Albania and World War 2. At the peak of its wartime production, the company had 26,000 employees. By 1954, its workforce had been reduced to around 8,000.

In 1962, Breda was nationalised as part of EFIM, but was liquidated in the 1990s. The train and tram manufacturing division fused with Ansaldo to form AnsaldoBreda, the armaments division became an independent entity as Breda Meccanica Bresciana, as did the research division as Istituto Scientifico Breda.

Products

Aircraft Products
 A.2
 A.4
 A.7
 A.8
 A.9
 A.10
 A.14
 Ba.15
 Ba.19
 CC.20
 Ba.25
 Ba.26
 Ba.27
 Ba.28
 Ba.32
 Ba.33
 Ba.39
 Ba.42
 Ba.44
 Ba.46
 Ba.64
 Ba.65
 Ba.75
 Ba.79S
 Ba.82
 Ba.88
 Ba.92
 Ba.201
 Ba.205
 BP.471
 BZ.308
 BZ.309
 Tebaldi-Zari

Rolling stock products

Locomotives 
 South African Class 15CA 4-8-2
 SEK class Μα
 E.330
 D.341
 D.345
 D.443
 E.424
 E.428
 E.636
 HŽ series 1061

DMU and EMU 
 ETR 200
 ETR 240
 ETR 300
 FNM Class E.750

Metro 
 Washington Metro 2000-Series, 3000-Series, 4000-series
 Breda A650

Tram and light rail 
 ATM Class 1500
 ATM Class 4600 and 4700
 LRVs for RTA Rapid Transit (Cleveland)
 MBTA Green Line Type 8 (production continued after merger)
 LRV2 and LRV3 for Muni Metro (San Francisco)

Trolleybuses
The production of trolleybuses was a small part of Breda's output, carried out through its subsidiary Breda Costruzioni Ferroviarie (it), and was not under way continuously.  Between 1936 and 1940, the company built a total of 28 trolleybuses, most for the Rome system but including six for Genoa. At various times between 1938 and 1956, more trolleybuses were built, but totalling only 16.  Production resumed in 1988.  Almost all of Breda's customers for trolleybuses were Italian trolleybus systems, but a notable exception was an order of 236 dual-mode buses that Breda built for the Seattle system between 1988 and 1991.

See also

 Leonardo
 AnsaldoBreda
 IMAM

References

Further reading
Luigi Giugni, Le imprese a partecipazione statale, Naples, Jovene, 1972
Pasquale Saraceno, Il sistema delle imprese a partecipazione statale nell'esperienza italiana, Milano, Giuffrè, 1975
Bruno Amoroso - Ole Jess Olsen, Lo stato imprenditore, Bari, Laterza, 1978
Nico Perrone, Il dissesto programmato. Le partecipazioni statali nel sistema di consenso democristiano, Bari, Dedalo, 1991
Nico Perrone, Italian and American Patterns in a Conflictive Development, Roskilde, Roskilde Universitetscenter, 1992
La Breda produce, mostra fotografica, dal sito dell’Istituto per la Storia dell’Età Contemporanea 
 La linea del fuoco

External links

Fondazione Isec - Breda 
Mostra fotografica online Fondazione Isec - La Breda produce 
Treccani.it BREDA, Ernesto 

 
AnsaldoBreda
Milan motor companies
Italian brands
Manufacturing companies of Italy
Trolleybus manufacturers
Defunct aircraft manufacturers of Italy
Manufacturing companies established in 1886
1886 establishments in Italy
Conglomerate companies of Italy
Bus manufacturers of Italy
Electric vehicle manufacturers of Italy